Cole Ully (born February 20, 1995) is a Canadian professional ice hockey forward. He is currently a free agent.

Ully was selected by the Dallas Stars in the fifth round (131st overall) of the 2013 NHL Entry Draft.

Playing career
Ully first played in the Alberta Midget Hockey League with the Calgary Jr. Flames. He was drafted 30th overall in the 2010 WHL Bantom Draft by the Kamloops Blazers.

Following his selection in the 2013 NHL Entry Draft, and in the midst of his fourth full season with the Blazers, Ully was signed to a three-year, entry-level contract with the Dallas Stars on December 19, 2014. During the 2014–15 WHL season while playing with the Kamloops Blazers, Ully scored 34 goals and 60 assists, and was named to the WHL Western Conference First All-Star Team.

Ully played the duration of his entry-level contract within the Dallas Stars minor league affiliate's, the Texas Stars and Idaho Steelheads.

As an impending restricted free agent from the Stars following the 2017–18 season, Ully was not tendered a qualifying offer and was released to free agency. On August 2, 2018, Ully agreed to a one-year AHL contract with the Colorado Eagles, affiliate to the Colorado Avalanche. After attending the Eagles inaugural AHL training camp, Ully was re-assigned to begin the 2018–19 season in the ECHL, with affiliate the Utah Grizzlies, on September 30, 2018. Ully made 38 appearances with the Grizzlies, posting 41 points, while suiting up in two contests with the Eagles during the season.

As a free agent from the Eagles, Ully continued in the AHL, securing a one-year contract with the Hershey Bears on August 12, 2019.

After two seasons within the Bears organization, Ully left North America and signed a European contract with Slovakian club, HKM Zvolen, on July 8, 2021. He made 14 appearances with Zvolen, collecting 11 points before ending his stint with the club on November 10, 2021. After that Ully played for HK Poprad in the Slovak Extraliga and he earned 34 points.

Career statistics

Awards and honours

References

External links

1995 births
Living people
Canadian ice hockey left wingers
Colorado Eagles players
Dallas Stars draft picks
Idaho Steelheads (ECHL) players
Kamloops Blazers players
South Carolina Stingrays players
Ice hockey people from Calgary
Texas Stars players
Utah Grizzlies (ECHL) players
HKM Zvolen players
HK Poprad players
Canadian expatriate ice hockey players in the United States
Canadian expatriate ice hockey players in Sweden
Canadian expatriate ice hockey players in Slovakia